Jirmejahu Oskar Neumann (1894–1981), also known as Oscar Neumann, was a Czech lawyer and writer in Bratislava, part of the Slovak State between 1939–1945. From December 1943, during the Holocaust, he served as president of the Slovak Judenrat (Jewish Council or Ústredňa Židov).

Activism

Initially the Judenrat's head of retraining, Neumann used his position to help the country's Zionist youth movement, according to Yehuda Bauer. He became part of the Judenrat's underground resistance, the Working Group, and when that was disbanded, in the sense that its work was merged with that of the Judenrat in general, he served as the Judenrat's president.

In April 1944 Neumann was one of the Judenrat leaders who interviewed Rudolf Vrba and Alfred Wetzler, Slovakian Jews who escaped to Bratislava from the Auschwitz concentration camp in occupied Poland. The men carried with them detailed information about the gas chambers and mass murders in the camp. The report compiled by the escapees and the Judenrat became known as the Vrba–Wetzler report. Neumann himself was sent to the Theresienstadt concentration camp; he was released in May 1945.

Im Schatten des Todes
Neumann was the author of a postwar memoir, Im Schatten des Todes: Ein Tatsachenbericht vom Schicksalskampf des slovakischen Judentums ("In the shadow of death: A report on Slovakian Jewry's battle with fate"), which was published in German and Hebrew in Israel in 1956. He dedicated the book to his mother, Friederike Neumann; his in-laws, Isidor and Julie Knoepfelmacher; Gisi Fleischmann, leader of the Bratislava Working Group; and the 70,000 martyrs of Slovakian Jewry who died in the camps and gas chambers.

The Holocaust historian Raul Hilberg alleged that the failure to translate Neumann's book into English could be traced to the taboo of examining the activity of Jewish Councils during the Holocaust. Hilberg argued that they "became a German tool". He wrote of Neumann's book: "Take another taboo: Jewish Councils. In Israel, a publisher in Tel Aviv had in his possession a memoir, four hundred pages long, written by Oskar Neumann. The only such memoir that exists—to my knowledge—of one of the chiefs of the Slovak Judenrat, the Ústredňa Židov. That book was published in German. It was published in Hebrew. But never in English. English-language publishers refused the request to translate and publish this book."

After the war
After the war, Neumann became the chair of the Histadrut (the socialist Zionist labour movement) in Czechoslovakia. He emigrated to Palestine in 1946, where he led the Association of Czechoslovakian Immigrants. He died in Israel in 1981.

Selected works
(1956). Im Schatten des Todes: Ein Tatsachenbericht vom Schicksalskampf des slovakischen Judentums. Tel Aviv: Edition 'Olamenu'. 
(1970). Gisi Fleishmann: The Story of a Heroic Woman. Tel Aviv: World (WIZO) Department of Organization and Education.

References
Citations

Sources

 
 
 
 
 
 

1892 births
1981 deaths
Bratislava Working Group members
Czech resistance members
Writers from Bratislava
Slovak Jews
Ústredňa Židov employees
Czechoslovak emigrants to Mandatory Palestine